Deesha Dyer (born 1978) is an American public servant who served as the White House Social Secretary for U.S. President Barack Obama from 2015 to 2017. Dyer also served as Deputy to the previous Social Secretary, Jeremy Bernard. She is currently the CEO of Hook & Fasten, a social-impact consulting company.

Early life 
Dyer grew up in Hershey, Pennsylvania and attended the Milton Hershey School, a boarding school founded by The Hershey Company. She attended the University of Cincinnati, but later dropped out and enrolled in Community College of Philadelphia where she earned an associate degree in women's studies.

Before working at the White House she worked as the executive assistant at the Pennsylvania Real Estate Investment Trust and a freelance writer at the Philadelphia Citypaper. She also started an HIV-awareness program, distributing fliers and condoms at local hip-hop clubs.

White house career 
At age 31, her White House career began as an intern in the Office of Scheduling and Advance in Fall 2009. 

Following her internship, Dyer became associate director for scheduling correspondence and then was named hotel program director. In this role, she travelled with the president and first lady and planned lodging accommodations.

She became deputy social secretary and was later promoted to special assistant to the president and social secretary, making her the Obama administration's fourth social secretary and the second of African-American descent.

Dyer won a 2017 NAACP Image Award for the BET special Love & Happiness: An Obama Celebration. She volunteers her time as the Executive Director of Philadelphia-based teen girl travel group, beGirl.world. 

In 2017, she was signed as a speaker to Outspoken Agency. In 2018, she contributed a chapter to West Wingers: Stories from the Dream Chasers, Change Makers, and Hope Creators Inside the Obama White House recounting her experiences in the Obama White House.

In 2019, Dyer created the Black Girl 44 Scholarship, which provides financial assistance to Black college women who are interning in politics or public service. The scholarship is housed through Impact of a Vote. The initiative, founded by Dyer, offers free workshops, newsletters, and job postings to help Black college students explore careers in politics and public service.

She founded Hook & Fasten, a social social-impact consulting company, and serves as the CEO.

Dyer has been featured in national media outlets including TIME, The New York Times, Elle, Marie Claire, Essence, Vogue, Refinery29, Forbes, The Root, and Washington Post.

References

1978 births
Living people
Community College of Philadelphia alumni
Milton Hershey School alumni
Obama administration personnel
Politicians from Philadelphia